Translation Wave is the fifth extended play (EP) by El Cantador, released on February 26, 2013.

Track listing
All songs written and performed by El Cantador. All lyrics by Heath Underwood (except "Ennui," written by Underwood and Lesley Smith Jones)

"Black Sound" – 2:25
"My Way" – 3:56
"Ennui" – 3:04
"Particle and Wave" – 5:53
"Reynosa" – 3:20
"Pilgrims" – 5:03

Recording
El Cantador took residence at the Mary C. O'Keefe Cultural Center of Arts and Education in Ocean Springs, MS for a total of six days in May and September 2012 to work on Translation Wave. With access to the building's Scharr-Ello studio, performance arts room, and main theater the trio was once again free to explore their sound within high ceilings and stairwells in one of the coast's most richly and artistically diversified areas. Chris Staples (TwoThirtyEight, Discover America, Telekinesis) was invited in to engineer three of the EP's more percussion oriented tracks (BlackSound, Particle and Wave, Reynosa).

Style
In this new collection of music we find a more intimate, cinematic, and sporadic group of songs. Translation Wave is an expression of how a band can morph and evolve from time on the road and turn to reflect on those experiences through instrumentation. Having already freed themselves of popular expectations on the previous album, El Cantador appears willing and able to take us anywhere at any time without notice. 

In the EP's first track, "BlackSound", the listener is greeted by a sparse and intricately picked out acoustic guitar riff alongside Underwood's immediate foretelling to "Don't buy into most of my dreams/I'll make your head spin with my own disconnectivity" - lyrics which imply Underwood's satisfaction in playing with language and could serve to intimate the EP's darker hues and cathartic uplifts. Translation Wave proudly hums with a warmth and rawness akin to older classic albums you might find in your local record bin.

Personnel 
Those involved in the making of Translation Wave are:

El Cantador
Sean Murphy – drums, percussion
Alex Scharr – bass, piano, synths, vocals
Heath Underwood – guitar/vocals/electric piano on "Ennui" 

Production
 El Cantador – producer, engineer
 Chris Staples - engineer
 Alex Scharr – mixing
 Sean Murphy – mixing
 Bill Roberts – mastering

Design
 Richard Humphreys – artwork, layout

References

2013 EPs